Word on the Street or Word on tha Streets may refer to:

Literature 
 The Word on the Street (book), a Bible-based book by Rob Lacey
 The Word on the Street (literary festival), an annual Canadian book and magazine festival
 Word on the Street (newspaper), a street newspaper in Baltimore, Maryland
 Word on the Street: Debunking the Myth of "Pure" Standard English, a 1998 book by John McWhorter

Music

Albums 
 Word on tha Streets (Bad Azz album), 1998
 Word on tha Streets (Skatterman & Snug Brim album), 2008
 Word on the Street, by Scene of Irony, 2010
 Word on the Street, by Youngblood Brass Band, 1998
 Word on the Street, a mixtape by Kaze, 2006
 Word on the Street: Harlem Recordings, 1989, by Satan and Adam, 2008

Songs 
 "Word on the Street", by Inspectah Deck from Uncontrolled Substance
 "Word on the Street", by Weird War from Illuminated by the Light

Other media 
 Word on the Street, a fictional talk show in the American TV sitcom Martin
 Word on the Street, a 2004-2005 art exhibition by Alexander Brattell
 Word on the Street, a game published by Out of the Box Publishing
 Word on the Street, a segment on the children's television show Sesame Street